Liverpool Software Gazette was a short-lived computer magazine published by Microdigital Ltd, a company who were based in Liverpool, England and run by Bruce Everiss.

History
The magazine was in print for only eight issues of which the last was a double issue. Issues were bi-monthly from November 1979 to February 1981 though the last was actually dated February/April 1981. Initially costing 50p, the price increased to 75p by the fifth edition while the final double edition cost £1.50. The page count started at around 50 though by the fifth edition had reached 100 pages.

The pressure of running both Microdigital and the magazine soon took its toll on the company, and the magazine was put up for sale during the final edition. It was sold to and incorporated into an Apple magazine where all non-Apple content was immediately dropped.

The magazine was intended for an audience of sophisticated and experienced computer users and tackled a wide range of subjects from languages, machine code and CPUs, systems (both large and small), games, programming techniques, astronomy. In many cases the articles went far deeper than those normally tackled by the computer magazines of the day.

Content
There were some regular columns such as Pets Corner (for the Commodore PET), Apple Pips (for the Apple II), Nascom Notes and Nybbles (small BASIC tips and routines).

Below are some of the contents from each of the issues. Note the general term for computers back then was Microcomputers (sometimes spelt as two words). In some cases the original spelling/typos have been left intact.

Issue 1:
 Sargon meets the Nascom
 Programming Practices and Technics
 M5 System - an Interpreter for the Nascom One
 I'm Pilot, fly me
 Acorn Mastermind
 Pascal bytes the Apple

Issue 2:
 Dungeons & Dragons Revisited
 Numerical Accuracy of Microcomputers
 Cesil - an introduction
 Acorn and the Kim
 Z-80 Processor Profile
 Revas & Zeap
 Application Software for Microcomputers
 Trekking by 'JTK'
 Byting more off your Disk

Issue 3:
 AIM 65 Assembler
 Graphics Shapes (Series)
 Pilot Takes Off
 Pascal - an Introduction (series)
 Algol 68C on the Z80
 Microcomputers and Biochemistry
 Sharp Machine Language
 Super Sort

Issue 4:
 Star Gate
 Jet Set
 6800 Processor Profile
 A Forth Introduction
 A Useful Pascal Program (series)
 A Marvel Called the MC6809
 A Number Processor for the Acorn
 Architectural Software on the Cheap
 Commercial Micro Software Fundamentals
 Social Effects of Micro Computers

Issue 5:
 Xtal Basic - The Extendable One
 Analysis of Systems Analysis
 Cesil Interpreted in Basic
 Algol 68
 Fortran 77
 Lisp
 Forms Processing
 Compiling Systems
 The Users View of Visicalc

Issue 6 (Pascal special):
 'Warning' Prolonged use of Pascal may seriously damage your mental health
 Integer Pascal on the Nascom
 Structured and not so Structured Programming
 TCL Pascal
 A Readers Contribution
 Alarming Your Computer
 The Romplus and Keyboard Filter
 Stargate Unlocked
 Tangerine Article
 MPL Language

Issue 7 (CP/M special):
 Microcomputer Disk Operating Systems
 CP/M on the Sharp MZ-80K
 Z0 Article
 Graphics Software for the Apple II
 Introduction to Hi Resolution Graphics on the Apple
 Sharp PC 1211
 Getting More From Your Genie
 Micro Chips in Use Now
 A Simple Machine

Issue 8/9:
 Curing 'Clear' Keys
 Systems Programming with High Level Languages
 Macro's and Micro's
 Pilot Takes Off
 A Useful Romplus Programme
 M.P.L. Language
 Connecting the General Instruments AY-3-8910 Programmable Sound Generator to the 6502/6800 bus
 Sharp Basics
 Flashy Graphics
 Writing Decent Basic Programmes
 Microcomputer Communications for the Hobbyist
 Introduction to the Main Features of Algol 68
 The TRS-80's Hidden Keyboard
 Apple D.O.S. 3.3

Notable articles
The article in issue number 4, "Architectural software on the cheap" was contributed by Paul Coates, then working in the School of Architecture at Liverpool Polytechnic. In the opinion of the author, this was one of the earliest examples of the serious use of cheap micros for CAD. In those days the conventional wisdom was that CAD required a much larger computer and  expensive graphics hardware. The article illustrated the use of the relatively cheap combination of a PET micro and an A3 plotter for generating floor plans, shadow casting and daylight calculation. The work illustrated was funded by a small RIBA (The Royal Institute of British Architects) grant for teaching architecture using computers.

The article on TCL Pascal in issue 6 was by Anne Scott and John Stout.

External links
 Article Architectural software on the cheap from Liverpool Software Gazette issue 4
 Computer magazine history featuring Liverpool Software Gazette
 Profile of Bruce Everiss
 PDFs of four issues can be found here
 Microdigital in Liverpool from Bruceongames
 Article by Bruce Everiss giving background to Liverpool Software Gazette

Home computer magazines
Defunct computer magazines published in the United Kingdom
Magazines established in 1979
Magazines disestablished in 1981
Bi-monthly magazines published in the United Kingdom
Mass media in Liverpool